The Southern Skies Spymotor is an American paramotor that was designed and produced by Southern Skies of Taylorsville, North Carolina for powered paragliding.

Design and development
The aircraft was designed to comply with the US FAR 103 Ultralight Vehicles rules. It features a paraglider-style high-wing, single-place accommodation and a single  Solo 210 engine in pusher configuration. As is the case with all paramotors, take-off and landing is accomplished by foot.

The propeller protection cage is made from a combination of silver-welded  stainless steel tubing and TIG-welded aluminium. Electric starting was a factory option.

Specifications (Spymotor)

References

1990s United States ultralight aircraft
Single-engined pusher aircraft
Paramotors